The Commissioner for Jobs and Social Rights is a member of the European Commission. The position was previously titled as the Commissioner for Employment, Social Affairs, Skills and Labour Mobility until 2019.

The portfolio is responsible for matters relating to employment, social affairs, skills and labour mobility. It also includes the coordination of the European Social Fund (ESF), the European Globalisation Adjustment Fund (EGF) and the management of the EU Programme for Employment and Social Innovation (EaSI), which brings together three EU programmes since 2014, namely EURES, PROGRESS and Progress Microfinance.

List of commissioners

See also
 Directorate-General for Employment, Social Affairs and Equal Opportunities
 European Social Fund
 European Year of Equal Opportunities for All

References

External links
 Commissioner's website
 European Commission's Directorate-General for Employment, Social Affairs and Equal Opportunities
 European Social Fund
 European Globalisation Adjustment Fund (EGF)
 EU Programme for Employment and Social Innovation (EaSI)
 EURES – European Job Mobility Portal

Employment, Social Affairs and Equal Opportunities